Walter Currie or Curry may refer to:

Mordaunt Currie (Walter Mordaunt Cyril Currie), poet 
Sir Walter Currie, 4th Baronet, of the Currie baronets
Walter Currie (footballer), Scottish footballer
Walter Currie (educator), Canadian educator and public advocate
Walter Curry (gridiron football),  gridiron football defensive tackle
Walter Clyde Curry (1887–1967), American academic, medievalist and poet

See also
James Walter Curry, Ontario barrister and political figure
Currie (surname)